The Romania national football team represents Romania in international association football and is controlled by the Romanian Football Federation. Between their first official match in 1922 and 1939, when competitive football stopped for the Second World War, Romania played in 82 matches, resulting in 36 victories, 14 draws and 32 defeats. Throughout this period they played in the Balkan Cup six times between 1931 and 1936 with Romania taking home three titles in 1929–31, 1933 and 1936. Romania also qualified through to three FIFA World Cup's during the 1930s where they got eliminated in the first round in all three attempts with the national team finishing second in their group at the 1930 edition before being eliminated by Czechoslovakia (1934) and Cuba (1938) respectively in the following cups.

1922

1923

1924

1925

1926

1927

1928

1929

1930

1931

1932

1933

1934

1935

1936

1937

1938

1939

References
All details are sourced to the match reports cited, unless otherwise specified:

External links
Romanian Football Federation
Matches of Romania 
RSSSF archive of results 1922–2006
FIFA.com - Romania: Fixtures and Results
World Referee - Matches featuring Romania
EU-Football - international football match results of Romania 1922-present

1922–23 in Romanian football
1923–24 in Romanian football
1924–25 in Romanian football
1925–26 in Romanian football
1926–27 in Romanian football
1927–28 in Romanian football
1928–29 in Romanian football
1929–30 in Romanian football
1930–31 in Romanian football
1931–32 in Romanian football
1932–33 in Romanian football
1933–34 in Romanian football
1934–35 in Romanian football
1935–36 in Romanian football
1936–37 in Romanian football
1937–38 in Romanian football
1938–39 in Romanian football